Womac is an unincorporated community in Macoupin County, in the U.S. state of Illinois.

History
A post office called Womac was established in 1888, and remained in operation until it was discontinued in 1910. The community was named for John J. Womac, a merchant and local landowner.

References

Unincorporated communities in Macoupin County, Illinois
Unincorporated communities in Illinois